Lewis Milestone (born Leib Milstein (Russian: Лейб Мильштейн); September 30, 1895 – September 25, 1980) was an American film director. He is known for directing Two Arabian Knights (1927) and All Quiet on the Western Front (1930), both of which received Academy Awards for Best Director. He also directed The Front Page (1931 – nomination), The General Died at Dawn (1936), Of Mice and Men (1939), Ocean's 11 (1960), and received the directing credit for Mutiny on the Bounty (1962), though Marlon Brando largely appropriated his responsibilities during its production.

Early life

Milestone was born Lev (or Leib) Milstein  in Kishinev, capital of Bessarabia of the Russian Empire (now Chișinău, Moldova), into a wealthy and distinguished family of Jewish heritage.

Milestone's primary education at Jewish schools reflected his parents' liberal social and political orientation, and included a study of several languages. Milestone's early love of theater and his desire to follow the dramatic arts was discouraged by his family, who dispatched their son to Mittweida, Saxony to study engineering.

Neglecting his classes to attend local theater productions, Milestone failed his coursework. Intent on pursuing a theatrical career, he purchased a one-way transatlantic ticket to the United States, arriving in Hoboken, New Jersey on 14 November 1913, shortly after his eighteenth birthday.

Struggling to support himself in New York City, Milestone worked odd jobs—"janitor, door-to-door salesman, lace-machine operator"—before finding a position as portrait and theater photographer in 1915. He enlisted in the Signal Corps in 1917 shortly after America's entry into World War I. Stationed in New York City and Washington, D. C., he was assigned to its photography unit and trained in aerial photography, assisted on training films and edited documentary combat footage. His cohorts at the Signal Corps included future Hollywood directors Josef von Sternberg and Victor Fleming.

In February 1919, Milestone was discharged from the army and immediately obtained his US citizenship, legally changing his surname from Milstein to Milestone. An acquaintance from the Signal Corps, Jesse D. Hampton, now an independent film producer, secured Milestone an entry level position in Hollywood as an assistant editor.

Hollywood apprenticeship 1919–1924

Milestone arrived in Hollywood in the same financial straits as he had in Hoboken, New Jersey as a Russian émigré in 1913. He recalled in later years that in order to sustain himself until his studio job commenced, he worked briefly as a card dealer at an oil field gambling joint.

Despite a number of mundane assignments from Hampton—at $20 per week—Milestone's trajectory from assistant editor toward director proceeded steadily. In 1920 he was tapped to serve as general assistant to director Henry King at Pathé Exchange.His first credited work was as assistant on King's 1920 Dice of Destiny.

During the next six years Milestone "took on jobs in any capacity available" with the Hollywood film industry, working as editor for director-producer Thomas Ince, as general assistant and co-author on film scripts by William A. Seiter and as a gag-writer for comedian Harold Lloyd. In 1923 he followed Seiter to Warner Brothers studios as assistant director on Little Church Around the Corner (1923), assuming most of the filmmaking tasks on the production. Milestone's reputation as an effective "film doctor" skilled at salvaging movies was such that Warners began offering his services to other studios at inflated rates.

Director: Silent era, 1925–1929

By 1925, Milestone was writing numerous screen treatments for films at Universal and Warners studios, among them The Mad Whirl, Dangerous Innocence, The Teaser and Bobbed Hair. The same year, Milestone approached Jack Warner with a proposition: he would provide the producer with a story gratis if he was allowed to direct it. Warner agreed to sponsor his directorial debut, Seven Sinners (1925).

Seven Sinners (1925): One of three films Milestone directed with Marie Prevost, and a former comedienne with Mack Sennett. Jack Warner appointed Darryl F. Zanuck as screenwriter. A "semi-sophisticated" comedy incorporating elements of slapstick, Seven Sinners proved sufficiently successful with critics and the public to warrant Milestone, now 29-years-old, additional directing assignments.

The Caveman (1926): Milestone delivered his second Prevost comedy The Caveman quickly and efficiently, earning him praise for its "adroit direction". During production, Milestone broke his contract with the studio over his exploitation as a "film doctor": Warners sued for damages and won, forcing Milestone to file for bankruptcy. The Caveman was his last film for Warners until Edge of Darkness in 1943. Undeterred, Milestone was quickly acquired by Paramount Pictures.
 
The New Klondike (1926): A sports-themed drama based on a Ring Lardner story was filmed on location in Florida. Despite a "lukewarm" response from critics, Paramount was enthusiastic regarding Milestone's prospects, showcasing him with other young studio talent in the promotional Fascinating Youth (1926). A subsequent contretemps with screen star Gloria Swanson on the set of Fine Manners (1926) led to Milestone walking off the project. Director Richard Rosson received credit when he completed the picture.
 
Two Arabian Knights (1927): Considered Milestones most outstanding work during the silent era, Two Arabian Knights was inspired by the Anderson–Stallings stage play What Price Glory? (1924), and director Raoul Walsh's 1924 screen adaption. The first film in a four-year contract with Howard Hughes' The Caddo Company—and his only film of 1927— it garnered Milestone an Academy Award for best comedy direction in 1927, prevailing over Charlie Chaplin's The Circus (1927). Set during World War I, doughboys William Boyd and Louis Wolheim, and love-object Mary Astor form a comic triangle.
 
The Garden of Eden (1927): Made under a Caddo releasing agreement with Universal Pictures, The Garden of Eden, "a variation on the Cinderella story...of acidic sophistication", was adapted by screenwriter Hans Kraly and resembles, in both script and visual production, the works of Ernst Lubitsch. The project benefited from the lavish sets designed by William Cameron Menzies and the cinematography of John Arnold. The film stars the popular Corinne Griffith. Milestone's cinematic rendering of Two Arabian Knights and The Garden of Eden established him as a skilled practitioner of "rough and sophisticated" comedy.

The Racket (1928): Wary of being stereotyped as a comedy director, Milestone shifted to an emerging genre popularized by director Josef von Sternberg in his gangland fantasy Underworld (1927). The Racket, a "taut and realistic" depiction of a mobster-controlled police department distinguished Milestone as an able practitioner of the genre, but its reception was blunted by a flood of less superior gangster films released in the late 1920s. Nonetheless The Racket was nominated for Best Picture at the 1928 Academy Awards.

Early sound era: 1929–1936

New York Nights (1929): Segue to sound 

Milestone's first foray into sound productions, New York Nights proved inauspicious. A vehicle for silent screen icon Norma Talmadge (spouse to producer Joseph Schenck), Milestone attempted to accommodate United Artists' desire to blend "show-biz" and gangster genres in an adaption of "the justly forgotten" Broadway production entitled Tin Pan Alley. Film historian Joseph Millichap appraises Milestone's effort:
 

Millichap adds that "the film is not worth considering as Milestone's first sound work."

Chef-d'œuvre: All Quiet on the Western Front (1930) 

Milestone's anti-war picture All Quiet on the Western Front is widely recognized as his directorial masterpiece and ranks as one of the most compelling dramatizations of soldiers in combat during The Great War. Adapted from Erich Maria Remarque's classic 1929 novel, Milestone conveyed cinematically the "grim realism and anti-war themes" that characterize the literary work. Universal studio's head of production Carl Laemmle Jr., purchased the film rights so as to capitalize on the international success of Remarque's book.

All Quiet on the Western Front presents the war from the perspective of a unit of patriotic young German soldiers who become disillusioned at the horrors of trench warfare. Actor Lew Ayres portrays the naive and sensitive youth Paul Baumer.

In collaboration with screenwriters Maxwell Anderson, Del Andrews and George Abbott, Milestone (uncredited) crafted a scenario and script that "reproduces the terse, tough dialogue" of Remarque's novel, so as to "expose war for what it is, and not glorify it." Originally conceived as a silent film, Milestone filmed both a silent and a talkie version, shooting them together in sequence.

The most outstanding technical innovation of All Quiet on the Western Front is the success to which Milestone integrated the rudimentary sound technology of the early talkies with the advanced visual effects developed during the late silent era. Applying post-synchronization of the sound recordings, Milestone was at liberty to "shoot the way we've always shot...it was that simple. All the tracking shots were done with a silent camera." In one of the film's most disturbing sequences, Milestone uses tracking shots and sound effects to graphically show the devastating effects of artillery and machine guns on advancing troops.
 
The picture met with immense critical and popular approval, earning a Best Picture Oscar and a second Best Director award for Milestone.

All Quiet on the Western Front established Milestone as a genuine talent in the film industry. Howard Hughes rewarded him with a prime property for adaption: Ben Hecht and Charles MacArthur 1928 play, The Front Page.

The Front Page (1931)

One of the most sensational and influential pictures of 1931, The Front Page introduced the Hollywood archetype of the hard-boiled and fast-talking reporter in Milestone's depiction of the backroom denizens of Chicago newspaper tabloids. The film's script retained the "sparkling dialogue [and] hard, fast and ruthless pace" that characterized Ben Hecht's and Charles MacArthur's stage production of 1928. The Front Page set the foundation for a virtual "journalism genre" in the 1930s, imitated by other studios and spawning a number of remakes, among them Howard Hawks' His Girl Friday (1940) and Billy Wilder's The Front Page (1974).

The selection of Pat O'Brien to play the hard-bitten reporter "Hildy" Johnson was disappointing to Milestone, whose request to cast James Cagney or Clark Gable in the role was vetoed by producer Howard Hughes, in favor of O'Brien, who had performed in the Chicago stage production The Front Page.

More than a product of Milestone's fidelity to the play's lively and profane dialogue, he endowed the work with an Expressionistic cinematic style. Biographer Joseph Millichap evaluates Milestone's technique:

Both the opening tracking shots of the newspaper's printing plant and the confrontation between Molly Malloy (Mae Clarke) and a phalanx of reporters demonstrate Milestone's mastery of the technique.

The Front Page received a Best Picture nomination at the Academy Awards and Milestone was listed among "The Ten Best Directors" by a Film Daily poll of 300 movie critics.

Troubled by film directors declining control within the studio system, Milestone gave his full support to King Vidor's proposal to organize a filmmaker's cooperative. Supporters for a Screen Directors Guild included Frank Borzage, Howard Hawks, Ernst Lubitsch, Rouben Mamoulian and William Wellman, among others. By 1938, the guild was incorporated, representing 600 directors and assistant directors.

Paramount Pictures was experiencing a financial crisis during the mid-1930s that inhibited their commitments to their European film stylists such as Josef von Sternberg, Ernst Lubitsch and Milestone. Under these conditions, Milestone embarked upon the final phase of his early sound period, a phase that exposed his difficulties in locating compelling literary material, production support and proper casting. The first among these films was Rain (1932).

Rain (1932): The short story "Miss Thompson" by Somerset Maugham has gone through several adaptive permutations, both for stage and film, before and after Milestone filmed the work in 1932.

Milestone was assigned rising star Joan Crawford by Allied Artists, known for her silent film roles as a flapper, to play the prostitute Sadie Thompson. Her suitability for part has been widely scrutinized, and according to film critic Joseph Millichap "almost every comment on the film says she was miscast." Crawford expresssed disappointment with her interpretation of the role.

Milestone was not encumbered as yet by the Production Code, and his portrayal of the overwrought Puritan missionary Reverend Davidson (Walter Huston) and his rape of Thompson blends violence with sexual and religious symbolism through adroit intercutting.
Termed "slow and stage-bound" and "stiff and stagey", Milestone offered his own assessment of Rain:

Hallelujah, I'm a Bum (1933): Released during the depths of the Great Depression, Hallelujah, I'm a Bum was an attempt by United Artists to reintroduce early talkie singer Al Jolson after his three-year hiatus from film roles. Based on a Ben Hecht story, with a score by Rodgers and Hart featuring innovative "rhythmic dialogue" delivered in song-song, its sentimental and romantic theme of a New York City tramp met with indifference or dismay among moviegoers. Film historian George Millichap observed that "the problem of this entertainment fantasy was that it brushed aside just enough reality to confuse its audience. Americans in the winter of 1933 were not in the mood to be advised that the life of a hobo was the road to true happiness, especially by a star earning $25,000 a week." Milestone's miscalculated effort to make a "socially conscious" musical was generally ill-received at its New York opening and Milestone was left struggling to locate a more serious film project.

Attempts by Milestone to make a film about the Russian Revolution (working title: Red Square), based on Stalinist Ilya Ehrenburg's The Life and Death of Nikolai Kourbov (1923), and an adaption of H. G. Wells's The Shape of Things to Come (1933) proposed by Alexander Korda, neither project materialized. In lieu of these unrealized films, Milestone proceeded to make "a string of three insignificant studio pieces" from 1934 to 1936.

The Captain Hates the Sea (1934): Milestone accepted a lucrative deal to film a John Gilbert vehicle and left United Artists for Harry Cohn's Columbia Pictures.
The Captain Hates the Sea was conceived and recognized by critics as a spoof of the 1932 star-studded anthology, Grand Hotel, which showcased Hollywood's emerging screen legends Greta Garbo, Joan Crawford and John Barrymore. Milestone's largely improvised film featured an ensemble of Columbia's character actors, among them Victor McLaglen and The Three Stooges. Described by critic George Millichap as "a very uneven, disconnected, rambling piece", the cost overruns on The Captain Hates the Sea—complicated by heavy drinking by the cast members—soured relations between Milestone and Cohen. The movie is notable as the final film of Gilbert's career.

Milestone next embarked on two films for Paramount, his only musicals of his career, but relatively undistinguished in their execution. Milestone described them as "insignificant": Paris in Spring (1935) and Anything Goes (1936).

Paris in Spring (1935) and Anything Goes (1936): Milestone was assigned Paris in Spring, a romantic musical farce. Leading man Tullio Carminati had just completed the operetta-like One Night of Love (1934) with Grace Moore at Columbia studios. Paramount paired their own Mary Ellis with Carminati, and it was Milestone's task to make a picture rivaling the Columbia success. Aside from a credible replica of Paris created by art directors Hans Dreier and Ernst Fegté, Milestone's camera work failed to overcome "the essential flatness of the tale."

Anything Goes, a musical starring Bing Crosby and Ethel Merman and adapted from his 1934 Cole Porter Broadway musical, enjoyed the advantage of some enduring numbers, including "I Get a Kick Out of You", "You're the Top", and the title song. Milestone's work is conscientious, but he showed little enthusiasm for the genre.

Milestone's personal life was more gratifying than his artistic endeavors in the mid-Thirties. In 1935 he and Kendall Lee Glaezner, an actress whose professional name was Kendall Lee, were married. She and Milestone had been a couple since they met on the set of his 1932 film Rain, in which Lee had played the role of Mrs. MacPhail. They remained married until Mrs. Milestone's death in 1978. They did not have any children. Biographer George Millichap reports that "over the years the Milestones were the most gracious of Hollywood hosts, giving parties that attracted the cream of the film community."

The General Died at Dawn (1936)
Following his two lackluster musicals, Milestone returned to form in 1936 with The General Died at Dawn, a film that in theme, setting and style is reminiscent of director Josef von Sternberg's The Shanghai Express (1932).

The screenplay written by Leftist playwright Clifford Odets is derived from an obscure  
pulp-influenced manuscript by Charles G. Booth. Set in the Far East, it carried a sociopolitical theme: the "tension between democracy and authoritarianism." Actor Gary Cooper plays the American mercenary O'Hara, a man possessing genuine republican commitments and whose character Milestone adroitly establishes in the opening frames. His adversary is the complex and multidimensional Chinese warlord General Yang played by Akim Tamiroff. Actress Madeleine Carroll is cast as the young missionary Judy Perrie ``trapped between divided social forces" who struggles to overcome her diffidence and ultimately joins O"Hara in supporting a peasant revolt against Yang.

Milestone's brings to the adventure-melodrama a "bravura" exposition of his cinematic style and outstanding technical skills: an impressive use of tracking, a 5-way split-screen and a widely noted use of a match dissolve that serves to transition action from a billiard table to a white door handle leading to an adjoining room, "one of the most expert match shots on record" according to historian John Baxter. 

Though disparaged by Milestone in retrospect, The General Died at Dawn is perhaps one of the "masterpieces" of 1930s Hollywood. Milestone was well-served by cinematographer Victor Milner, art directors Hans Dreier and Ernst Fegté, and composer Werner Janssen in creating "his most exquisite and exciting if not most meaningful examination of social friction in a human context."

Directorial hiatus: 1936–1939

After completing The General Died at Dawn, Milestone encountered a series of professional setbacks—"unsuccessful projects, broken contracts and lawsuits"—that placed his film career in abeyance for three years.

A number of serious projects which Milestone did pursue, including directing a film version of Vincent Sheean's Personal History (1935) (later directed as Foreign Correspondent (1940) by Alfred Hitchcock) went unfulfilled, as did a screenplay written by Milestone and Clifford Odets for a film adaption of the Sidney Kingsley Broadway hit Dead End (1935) for Sam Goldwyn that went to William Wyler, a director, like Milestone, of literary texts.

The Night of Nights (1939): In an effort to remain employed, Milestone accepted Paramount's offer to direct Pat O'Brien in a show business programmer The Night of Nights. A "second-line" studio production, the film was best served by Hans Dreier's stage settings.

After signing a contract with Hal Roach in late 1937 to film a version of Eric S. Hatch's novel Road Show (1934), Milestone was dismissed by the producer for straying from the comedic elements of the work. Litigation ensued, and the matter was resolved when Roach presented Milestone with another project: to adapt to film John Steinbeck's novella Of Mice and Men (1937).

Of Mice and Men (1939)

Milestone had been favorably impressed with both Steinbeck's novella Of Mice and Men and its 1938 stage production, a morality play set during the Dust Bowl, and he embraced the film project with enthusiasm. Producer Hal Roach hoped to emulate the anticipated success of director John Ford's adaption of another Steinbeck work, The Grapes of Wrath (1940). Both films drew upon the political and creative developments that emerged in the Great Depression, rather than the approaching 1940s and the impending conflict in Europe. Milestone enlisted Steinbeck support for the film and the author "essentially approved the script" as did the Hays Office who made only "minor" changes to the scenario.

The film opens with what was at the time an innovative device, a visual prologue that sets the "mood, tone [and] themes", identifying the lead characters, George and Lennie (played by Burgess Meredith and Lon Chaney Jr., respectively) as itinerant laborers, even before the credits are displayed. As a cinematic interpretation of a literary work, Of Mice and Men managed to convincingly blend the elements of each art form. Milestone maintains the " anti-omniscient" detachment that Steinbeck applied to his novella with a cinematic viewpoint that matches the author's literary realism. Milestone placed great emphasis on visual and sound motifs that serve to develop the characters and themes . As such, he conferred carefully on image motifs with art director Nicolai Remisoff, and cameraman Norbert Brodine and persuaded composer Aaron Copland to provide the musical score. Critic Kingley Canham points to the importance Milestone placed on his sound motifs:

The picture garnered Copland nominations for both Best Musical Score and Best Original Score.

Milestone, who preferred to cast "relative unknowns"—in this case influenced by budgetary restraints—Lon Chaney Jr. to play the childlike Lennie Small and Burgess Meredith who plays his keeper George Milton. Actress Betty Field, in her first important feature, plays Mae, the faithless spouse of straw boss Curly (Bob Steele).

Though nominated for Best Picture of 1939, Of Mice and Men had the shared misfortune of competing with a veritable pantheon of Hollywood films: The Wizard of Oz (Victor Fleming), Stagecoach (John Ford), Goodbye, Mr. Chips (Sam Wood), Mr. Smith Goes to Washington (Frank Capra), Dark Victory (Edmund Goulding), Love Affair (Leo McCarey), Ninotchka (Ernst Lubitsch), Wuthering Heights (William Wyler), and the winner, Gone with the Wind (Victor Fleming)."

Despite critical accolades for Milestone's Of Mice and Men, the tragic narrative that ends in the mercy-killing of the doomed Lennie at the hands of his comrade George was less than gratifying to audiences, and it failed at the box office.

Lucky Partners (1940) and My Life with Caroline (1941): Milestone's reputation as a director was undiminished among Hollywood executives after Of Mice and Men, and he was signed by RKO to direct two light comedies, both of which were vehicles for Ronald Colman. Provided with his own production unit, he quickly satisfied his contractual obligations, directing Ginger Rogers in her post- Astaire period in Lucky Partners, and marshaling Anna Lee in the "totally disarming frolic" in My Life With Caroline.

My Life With Caroline was released in August 1941, just four months before Pearl Harbor and America's entry as a belligerent in World War II.

World War II Hollywood propaganda: 1942–1945

Milestone's reputation as the director of All Quiet on the Western Front (1930), though an emphatically pacifist and anti-war film, positioned the director as an asset in Hollywood's "patriotic and profitable" production of anti-fascist war films.
 
Film curator Charles Silver noted Milestone's "facility for capturing battle's intrinsic spectacle...there is an inevitable pageantry to cinematic warfare that works against whatever pacifist intentions the filmmaker may have." Milestone reflected "how can you make a pacifist film without showing the violence of war?" Responding to the "general climate of opinion in wartime Hollywood" Milestone abandoned any reservations as to his commitments to the US war effort and offered his services to the film industry's propaganda units.

Our Russian Front (1942) 
Our Russian Front is a war documentary assembled from 15,000 feet of newsreel footage taken on the Russian front by Soviet citizen-journalists during Nazi invasion of the USSR in 1941. In collaboration with Dutch filmmaker Joris Ivens, working with The Government Film Service in 1940, Milestone depicted the struggle of Russian villagers to resist the German invasion of the Soviet Union. Actor Walter Huston narrated the documentary and the composer Dimitri Tiomkin provided the film score.

=== Edge of Darkness''' (1943) ===
Milestone returned to Warner Brothers in a one-film contract after seventeen years, his last feature with the studio the silent movie The Caveman (1926). The first of three successful films he made in collaboration with screenwriter Robert Rossen, Edge of Darkness signaled a change in Milestone's attitude toward his war films, both professionally and personally. The director of the anti-war film All Quiet on the Western Front (1930) made this explicit in 1943:
 

 Edge of Darkness is Milestone's fulsome demonstration of these sentiments that exposed "the severe limitations" created by Hollywood's self-imposed propaganda requirements. Film critics Charles Higham and Joel Greenberg comment on this phenomenon:

 Edge of Darkness unfolds in a remote Norwegian village where its inhabitants are brutalized by Nazi occupiers, inspiring collective resistance among the townspeople who liquidate their oppressors in a single, violent uprising. Milestone employs an "anti-suspense" device, that shows the ultimate carnage suffered by the inhabitants, then reveals the story in flashback. A melodramatic film fantasy, Milestone's "thematic oversimplification", reflected Hollywood's penchant for melodramatic propaganda.
 
Milestone was ambivalent regarding the cast and their characterizations for Edge of Darkness. The picture stars Errol Flynn and Ann Sheridan, who had been costars in the western Dodge City, here portraying Norwegian freedom fighters. Helmut Dantine appears as the sociopathic Nazi commandant. Biographer George Millichap reports that "the frequent rasp of New York accents from Norwegians and Nazis" distracts from the picture's authenticity. A number of the players, including Flynn, were embroiled in personal and legal issues that detracted from their work on the production.

Milestone's overall cinematic execution renders the story adequately in a realist style, but lacks his bravura use of the camera.
In one exceptional scene, Milestone reveals the dramatic epiphany experienced by the villagers when the Nazis publicly burn the local schoolteacher's library collection. Through expert cutting and panning, Milestone documents a collective transformation that will spur the outraged residents to plan an armed uprising against their oppressors.Edge of Darkness delivered effective war propaganda to Warner Brothers studios and fulfilled Milestone's contract. His next project was set on the Eastern Front in a Sam Goldwyn production at RKO: The North Star (1943).

 The North Star (1943) The North Star is a war propaganda picture dramatizing the devastation wrought by the German invasion of the USSR on the inhabitants of a Ukrainian farming collective. US President Roosevelt dispatched Lowell Mellett, the chief of the Bureau of Motion Pictures of the Office of War Information to enlist producer Sam Goldwyn in making a film celebrating America's wartime alliance with Russia. Milestone's "lavish" production support included playwright-screenwriter Lillian Hellman, cinematographer James Wong Howe, set designer William Cameron Menzies, film score composer Aaron Copland, lyricist Ira Gershwin and a competent cast of players.Murphy, 1999. p. 16: The North Star was made "at the request of President Roosevelt with the conscious aim winning the support of the American public for its wartime ally, the Soviet Union."

The Hellman script and Milestone's cinematic compositions establish the bucolic settings and social unity that characterizes the collective's inhabitants. Milestone uses a tracking shot to follow the aged comic figure Karp (Walter Brennan) as he rides his cart through the village, a device Milestone uses to introduce the film's key characters. An extended sequence portrays the villagers celebrating the harvest with food, song and dance, resembling more an ethnic operetta, with Milestone using an overhead camera to record the circular symmetry of the happy revelers.Hoberman, 2014: "The peasants were played, without [adopting Russian] accents, by…all-American types: Dana Andrews, Anne Baxter, Dean Jagger...Walter Brennan...appeared as semi-comic stock characters with Walter Huston, as the village doctor, supplying the sort of moral authority...The chief villains were Erich von Stroheim (once billed as The Man You Love to Hate) and Martin Kosleck..." Milestone displays his "technical mastery" both through image and sound as villagers discern the approach of German bombers announcing the shattering of their peaceful existence. Portions of this sequence resemble documentary war footage, recalling Milestone's work in All Quiet on the Western Front (1930) and Joris Ivens The Spanish Earth (1937).

Beyond this point, the necessities of Hollywood war propaganda asserts itself, shifting the focus to German atrocities. Hellman's screenplay provides for a complex treatment only for the German aristocrat and surgeon Dr. Otto von Harden (Erich von Stroheim), who, though dragooned into service, rationalizes Nazi atrocities. Milestone presents him in the Gothic style of German expressionism.Millichap, 1981 p. 122: "...Hellman's script [calls for] one multi-dimensionsl character...Dr. Kurin…" Russian doctor Dr. Pavel Grigorich Kurin (Walter Huston), Harden's moral opposite and nemesis, ultimately dispatches his Nazi prisoner. Biographer Joseph Millichap observed that "Single-minded hatred of Fascist evil countenanced action, shooting a prisoner [the Nazi Dr. Harden] or shooting a mindless melodrama..."

The film's melodramatic climax resembles a commercial action-movie, where untrained Russian guerrilla fighters overrun and obliterate the Nazi stronghold and its defenders.

The picture received fulsome approval from the mainstream press, with only the Hearst papers interpreting the film's pro-Russian themes as pro-Communist propaganda. The Academy of Arts and Sciences nominated The North Star for Best Art Direction, Best Cinematography, Best Special Effects, Best Musical Score, Best Sound and Best Original Screenplay. The film was largely ignored at the box office.Cojoc, 2013 pp. 93-95: "...Life magazine (1943) called it 'an eloquent tone poem (...) a document showing how the people fight and die" [while] the Hearst Press condemned it as communist propaganda..."Passafiume, 2009. TCM: Hearst papers "made the outrageous suggestion that the film was not only Red propaganda but Nazi propaganda…" And "...positive reviews did little to help The North Star, which ultimately fizzled at the box office..."

Sam Goldwyn's The North Star and two other films—Warner Brothers' Mission to Moscow (1943) and M-G-M's Song of Russia (1944)—came under scrutiny by the anti-communist House Un-American Activities Committee in the post-war years.Barson, 2020: "...Lillian Hellman's script gave the picture a political tone that would land the filmmakers in trouble with the House Un-American Activities Committee (HUAC) just a few years later."The North Star was reissued in a heavily reedited form that expunged any sequences that celebrate life under the Stalinist regime. Retitled Armored Attack and released in 1957, the setting is represented as Hungary during its uprising with a voice-over condemning communism.

 The Purple Heart (1944) 
In the Pacific War during WWII, captured American airmen are prosecuted by Imperial Japan with violating the Geneva Conventions for participating in the July 18, 1942 Doolittle Raid over Japan by B-25 bombers, specifically through indiscriminate bombing of civilian targets.

Based on a true incident, Milestone's technical skill in presenting the airmen's ordeal, and the inherent injustice they endured made for potent propaganda, but at the risk of rationalizing the US bombing and anti-Japanese jingoism.The Purple Hearts, upon which the captured officers and men are ultimately bestowed, is earned through wounds inflicted by torture to extract military secrets, and not through combat.
 A cinematically superior war film, Milestone defended his commitments to supplying propaganda for the American war effort: " We didn't hesitate to make this kind of film during the war."

 Guest in the House (1944) 
A psychological thriller à la Alfred Hitchcock, Milestone was removed from the project when he experienced an emergency appendectomy during filming. Milestone contributed some scenes in this United Artists production that was ultimately credited to director John Brahm. The film prepared Anne Baxter for her starring role in Joseph L. Mankiewicz's 1950 feature All About Eve.Millichap, 1981 pp. 128-129: "...his appendix ruptured…" during filming and had it removed.

 A Walk in the Sun (1945) 
In his second collaboration with screenwriter Robert Rossen, and based on Harry Joe Brown's 1944 book, Milestone's invested $30,000 of his own savings, a measure of his enthusiasm for the literary property and its cinematic potential.A Walk in the Sun takes place during the US invasion of Italy during WWII: a platoon of American soldiers are tasked with advancing inland six miles from Salerno to take a German-held bridge and farmhouse. The social and economic backgrounds of the officers and men represent a cross-section of America, who often express ambivalence about the purpose of the war. Film critic Kingley Canham describes the characters as "a group of unwilling civilians, who find themselves at war in a strange land...a sense of hopelessness pervades the film and the final outcome means nothing to the men who are fighting the war..."Barson, 2020: "A Walk in the Sun (1945) was a stylistically adventurous war drama, adapted by Robert Rossen from the novel by Harry Brown. The film focuses almost entirely on the states of mind of several soldiers (Andrews, Conte, and John Ireland) as they try to take a Nazi-held farmhouse in Italy."

Milestone's perspective on war as conveyed in A Walk in the Sun differs with that of his 1930 All Quiet on the Western Front, a moving indictment of war. Biographer Joseph Millichap observes:

{{blockquote| "All Quiet on the Western Front, both the novel and the film, used the microcosm of one platoon to make a major thematic statement about the macrocosm of war. A Walk in the Suns thematic statement is muted by the demands of propaganda and the studio system in the film."}}

Despite these limitations, Milestone avoided the "set hero and mock heroics" typical of Hollywood war movies, allowing for a measure of genuine realism reminiscent of his 1930 masterwork. Milestone's trademark handling of tracking shots is evident in the action scenes.

The Red Scare and the Hollywood Blacklist

At the onset of the Cold War, Hollywood studios, in alliance with the US Congress, sought to expose alleged communist inspired content in American films. Milestone's pro-Russian The North Star (1943), made at the behest of the US government to encourage American support for its wartime alliance with the USSR against the Axis powers became a target.

The North Star, as well as Michael Curtiz's Mission to Moscow (1943), Gregory Ratoff's Song of Russia (1944) and Jacques Tourneur's Days of Glory (1944) were "to haunt their creators in the McCarthy era" when any hint of sympathy for the Soviet Union was considered subversive to American ideals.Cojoc, 2013 pp. 93-95: "in the wake of the Cold War the HUAC (House Un-American Activities Committee), the Catholic League of Decency, the Motion Picture Alliance and the Alliance for Preservation American Values put up together the infamous blacklists of people presumed to be members of the Communist Party, or have communist beliefs. Hearings regarding Communist infiltration of the Motion Pictures were held by HUAC in 1947, and the main targets were the contributors to wartime [Hollywood] pro-Soviet pictures..."

Milestone's alignment with liberal causes such as Committee for the First Amendment compounded suspicions that he harbored pro-communist sentiments during the Red Scare. He and other filmmakers were summoned by the HUAC for questioning. Biographer Joseph Millichap describes Milestone's ordeal:

The precise impact of the Hollywood blacklist on Milestone's creative output is unclear. Unlike many of his colleagues, he continued to find work, but, according to film critic Michael Barson, the quantity and quality of his offers may have been limited through industry "greylisting". Millichap adds that "Milestone refused to comment on this side of his life: evidently he found it very painful."Walsh, 2001: "According to some, Milestone was a victim of the blacklist..."Millichap, 1981 p. 142: "...did guilt by association block the financial backing necessary for truly creative projects, or did pressure make him opt for 'safe' subjects in Arch of Triumph, The Red Pony and Halls of Montezuma?. Milestone refused to comment of this side of his life: evidently his always found it very painful." (Millichap footnote indicates his 1979 interview with the director as source.)

The post-war films: 1946–1951

The movies that Milestone directed in the late Forties represent "the last distinctive period" in the director's creative output. His first effort after completing his series of wartime propaganda pictures was a Hal B. Wallis production, The Strange Love of Martha Ivers, based on the story "Love Lies Bleeding" by John Patrick.

The Strange Love of Martha Ivers (1946): a film noir classic

In collaboration with screenwriter Robert Rossen and some outstanding artistic support, Milestone directed The Strange Love of Martha Ivers, a "striking addition" to the post-war Hollywood film genre of film noir, combining a grim 19th century romanticism with the cinematic methods of German Expressionism.

Rossen and Milestone's script provided the capable cast, starring Barbara Stanwyck, Van Heflin and Kirk Douglas (in his first screen appearance) with a "taut, harsh" narrative that critiqued postwar urban America as corrupt and irredeemable. Cinematographer Victor Milner's camerawork supplied the film noir effects and musical director Miklós Rózsa effectively integrated sound motifs with Milestone's visual elements.Higham and Greenberg, 1968 pp. 20-21: "the minatory score of...Miklos Rozs." The final cut was marred by Wallis's post-production insertion of close-ups to promote his rising Paramount property Lizabeth Scott.Millichap, 1981 p. 144: "Only one member of the production staff really hindered Milestone: producer Hal B. Wallis [who insisted] on inserting a number of pointless close-ups of his latest starlet, Lizabeth Scott, in Milestone's finished director's print. The inserts [of Scott] stand out like sore thumbs...the rest of the film is as faultless in its visual rhythms as everything Milestone ever did."

Milestone left Paramount and moved to the rising independent Enterprise Studios. His first film for Enterprise was Arch of Triumph, based on the Erich Maria Remarque 1945 novel.

Arch of Triumph (1948)

Milestone's second adaption of an Erich Maria Remarque novel, Arch of Triumph, was highly anticipated by moviegoers, and by Enterprise Studios, which committed huge capital investments to the project. Set in pre-war Paris of 1939, Remarque's autobiographical work examines the personal devastation suffered by two displaced persons: the surgeon Dr. Ravic, fleeing Nazis persecution, and the demimonde courtesan Joan Modau. Each of the lovers suffers a tragic fate.

Remarque's brutally realistic depictions of the Paris underworld, which describe a revenge murder and a mercy-killing approvingly, was at odds with the strictures of the Production Code Administration. Milestone accordingly excised "the bars, brothels and operating rooms" as well as the sordid ending from the screenplay. Enterprise studio executives, who called for a picture that would rival Metro-Goldwyn-Mayer's recently re-released Gone with the Wind (1939), had procured Charles Boyer and Ingrid Bergman to that end. The miscasting of screen stars Boyer and Bergman as Dr. Ravic and Joan Madou, respectively, impaired Milestone's development of these characters with respect to the literary source. The director described his difficulty:
 

 
Milestone delivered a lengthy four-hour version of Arch of Triumph that had been pre-approved by Enterprise. Executives reversed that decision shortly before its release, cutting the picture to the more standard two hours. Entire scenes and characters were eliminated, undermining the clarity and continuity of Milestone's work. The film includes some of the macabre elements of the novel through effective use of expressionistic camera angles and lighting effects. Milestone's overall disaffection from the project is evident in his indifferent application of cinematic technique, contributing to the failure in his film adaption. Biographer Joseph Millichap observes: 
 

Millichap adds that "Wherever the blame is placed, Arch of Triumph is a clear failure, a bad film made from a good book."

Arch of Triumph proved an egregious failure at the box office, with Enterprise suffering significant losses. Milestone continued with the studio, accepting an offer to produce and direct a comedy vehicle for Dana Andrews and Lilli Palmer: No Minor Vices (1948).
Millichap, 1981 p. 156: "...both an artistic and financial disaster. It grossed $1,5 millon, while it cost almost $4 million to make."And p. 157: "in later years he has practically disowned the film…"

No Minor Vices (1948): A "semi-sophisticated" programmer reminiscent of Milestone's 1941 comedy My Life with Caroline at RKO, it added little to Milestone's oeuvre.Canham, 1974 p. 99: Milestone "continued to work prolifically, turning our a rarely seen comedy, No Minor Vices…"

Milestone departed Enterprise and joined novelist John Steinbeck at Republic Pictures to make a film version of The Red Pony (1937).

The Red Pony (1949)

Novelist John Steinbeck's The Red Pony is a story sequence set in California's rural Salinas Valley in the early 20th century. Milestone and Steinbeck had considered adapting these coming-of-age stories about a boy and his pony since 1940. In 1946 they partnered with Republic Pictures, an amalgamation of "poverty row" studios known for low-budget westerns, but now prepared to invest in a major production.
 
Steinbeck served as sole screenwriter on The Red Pony. His novella, comprising four short stories, is "unified only by continuities of character, setting theme." Identifying a market for the film was a key concern for Republic, insisting on a picture aimed at juvenile audiences. In the interests of crafting a sequential and coherent narrative, Steinbeck limited the film adaption primarily to two of the stories, "The Gift" and "The Leader of the People", obviating some of the harsher episodes in the literary work. Steinbeck willingly provided a more upbeat ending to the picture, an accommodation that according to film critic George Millichap "completely distorts...the thematic thrust of Steinbeck's story sequence."

The casting for The Red Pony presented some difficulties for Milestone in developing Steinbeck's characters and themes, which explore a child's "initiation into the realities of adult life." The aging ranch hand Billy Buck is portrayed by the youthful and virile Robert Mitchum, whose character effectively displaces the father Fred Tiflin (Shepperd Strudwick) as male mentor to the nine-year-old Tom Tiflin (Peter Miles). The boy's mother is played by Myrna Loy, best known in her roles as the sophisticated spouse to William Powell in The Thin Man (1934) and its sequels, here playing a rancher's wife. Film critic Joseph Millichap points to the inherent difficulties in a film portrayal of the boy Tom, played by the then 10-year-old Miles: "The major casting problem is the [young] protagonist. Perhaps no child star could capture the complexity of this role, as it is much easier for an adult to write about sensitive children than for a child to play one."
 
Though Milestone's cinematic effort fails to do justice to the literary source, several of the visual and aural elements are impressive. The effective opening sequence resembles the prologue he used in his 1939 adaption of Steinbeck's novel Of Mice and Men, introducing the natural world that will dominate and inform the lives of the characters.
 
In his first technicolor picture, Milestone's "graceful visual touch" is enhanced by cameraman Tony Gaudio's painterly renderings of the rural landscape. Composer Aaron Copland's highly regarded film score perhaps surpasses Milestone's visual rendering of Steinbeck's story. 
 
The Red Pony provided Enterprise studios with a satisfactory "prestige" property, generating critical praise and respectable box office returns. Milestone moved to 20th Century Fox where he made three films: Halls of Montezuma (1951), Kangaroo (1952) and Les Misérables (1952).

Halls of Montezuma (1951): Released in January 1951, Halls of Montezuma reflects the Cold War imperatives that informed Hollywood films during the Korean War. The story by Michael Blankfort, with Milestone co-screenwriter (uncredited) concerns an attack by US Marines on a Japanese held island during World War II. The film focuses on the heroic suffering experienced by one patrol in its effort to locate a Japanese rocket-launching bunker. Milestone's dual themes provides both for a fulsome celebration of Marine combat heroics, juxtaposed with an examination of psychological damage to the soldiers who must personally participate in the "horrors" of modern warfare, including the torture of enemy combatants. Milestone denied that Halls of Montezuma addressed his "personal beliefs" on the nature of war and had agreed to make the movie strictly as a financial expedient.

Halls of Montezuma recalls some elements of Milestone's 1930 anti-war classic All Quiet on the Western Front. The film's cast, like the earlier film, was selected from relatively unknown actors, their "complex and believable" characterizations revealing the contrasts between hardened veterans and green recruits. The cinematic handling of battle scenes is also reminiscent of the 1930 movie, where Marines deploy from their landing crafts and advance on open terrain under enemy fire. Milestone reverts to the formulaic war movie with a standard "Give 'em Hell" climax, accompanied by the strains of the Marine Hymn. The film is commonly cited as representing the onset of a purported decline in his talents or his exploitation by the studios.

Late career, 1952–1962

Milestone's final years as a filmmaker correspond to the decline and fall of the Hollywood movie empire: the final eight films of his career reflect these historic developments. By 1962, shortly before the release of his last Hollywood film Mutiny on the Bounty, Films and Filming (December 1962) made this explicit: "In common with so many of the Old Guard directors, Lewis Milestone's reputation has somewhat tarnished over the last decade. His films no longer have that stamp of individuality which distinguished his early work..."

Milestone's films during his last ten years of his career were characterized by biographer Joseph Millichap as "less a reprise of the director's earlier achievements than several desperate efforts to keep working. Even more markedly than in his earlier career, Milestone moved frenetically between pictures which varied widely in setting, style and accomplishment."Canham, 1974 pp. 69–70: "The later half of the Fifties proved to be a key era in the history of Hollywood. It was a significant turning point in that it marked the end of the 'golden years of Hollywood; the gigantic star factory...had begun to crumble at the beginning of the decade under pressure from the spreading popularity of television,[as well as] the hysterical the publicity that arose from the investigation into Hollywood folk by the House Un-American Activities Committee [which] stopped many careers dead, and sent other into exile of "ghost" work. The studios began to tighten the purse strings...[and the industry resorted to] gimmicks and technical modification such as 3-D, CinemaScope and Cinerama..."Gow, 1971 p. 10: "...the McCarthy method were so bull-dozing...the many were unfairly victimized...And Hollywood ""long accustomed to...accumulating wealth with practiced ease, was suddenly battered in the Fifties by challenges to its security. Among these challenges, the greatest by far was television...to compete with television, the obvious move was to offer in cinema an experience unavailable in the rival medium...Color [and] CinemaScope..."

After completing Halls of Montezuma (1951) for 20th Century Fox, the studio sent him to Australia to utilize funds limited to reinvestment in that country. Based on this pragmatic consideration, Milestone filmed Kangaroo (1952).Millichap, 1981 p. 175: "the director's development paralleled Hollywood history as he tried his hand at television, foreign productions and earlier [film] classics. None of these films really require close analysis..."

Kangaroo (1952): Termed an "antipodal Western" by film critic Bosley Crowther, Milestone chief struggle with 20th century was over "the utterly ridiculous script, a collection of Western clichés transposed from the American plains to the Australian outback" according to film critic Joseph Millichap. Milestone attempted to evade the poor literary vehicle by concentrating on "the landscape, flora and fauna" of the Australian outback at the expense of dialogue. The Technicolor cinematography by Charles G. Clarke achieved a documentary-like quality, incorporating Milestone hallmark panning and tracking methods.Millichap, 1981 p. 176: See here for camerawork, comparisons to John Ford and Howard Hawks depictions of the American West. And Burdened with a "hapless plot" Kangaroo "proves to be only another [of Milestone's] interesting failures."Higham, 1974 pp. 130-131: "first rate action scenes [including] a cattle stampede [that emulates] Harry Watt's The Overlanders [and] "once again demonstrated that, as a master of natural environments, Milestone was second to none..."

Les Misérables (1952): For the last of his three pictures at 20th Century Fox, Milestone delivered a 104-minute version of Victor Hugo's sprawling romance novel Les Misérables (1862). Fox producers endowed the project with their foremost contract players, including Michael Rennie, Debra Paget, Robert Newton and Sylvia Sidney and lavish production support. The script by Richard Murphy "telescopes all the novel's famous set-pieces into this cliché-ridden" abbreviated adaption.Millichap, 1981 pp. 176-177: "Casting does not aid Milestone's effort..." And See p. 176 for "cliche-ridden" comment. In a 1968 interview with film historians Charles Higham and Joel Greenberg, Milestone recalled his approach during the filming of Les Miserables: "Oh, for Chrissake, it was just a job; I'll do it and get it over with." Film critic Joseph Millichap observes: "that he did little with [Hugo's] literary classic...seems to indicate the waning of Milestone's creative energies."

 Sojourn in Europe, 1953–1954 
Milestone traveled abroad to England and Italy seeking work during the Fifties where he directed a biography of a diva, filmed an action World War II drama as well as an international romance-melodrama.

Melba (1953): Filmed in England at Horizon Pictures, Melba is a biopic of the famed coloratura soprano Dame Nellie Melba. The picture was an effort by producer Sam Spiegel to capitalize on the popularity of recent film biographies of Enrico Caruso and Gilbert and Sullivan. Metropolitan Opera star Patrice Munsel made her screen debut playing the Australian opera diva. Aside from Munsel's serviceable performance, Milestone was burdened by a "worthless script" and an "insipid cast" and failed to deliver a compelling rendering of Dame Melba's life. Film historian Kingsley Canham reports that the picture "turned out to be a disastrous flop" at the box office.Millichap, 1981 p. 177: "...the [Munsel] vehicle turned out to be another Hollywood travesty…[Milestone's] ersatz biography." Milestone remained in England during 1953 to film a war-adventure for Mayflower Pictures–British Lion Films: They Who Dare, starring British actor Dirk Bogarde.

They Who Dare (1953): In his penultimate war film, Milestone dramatizes a factual account of British and Greek commando unit assigned to destroy a German airfield on the island of Rhodes during World War II. Based on a script by Robert Westerby, Milestone delivers an action-packed climax in the final minutes of the film that recalls his early work in this genre, but the picture failed to elicit enthusiasm among critics and audiences. Biographer Kingsley Canham remarked that Milestone's back-to-back box office failures—Melba and They Who Dare—"was not a good omen for an established director, especially in the Fifties..."Whitely, 2020: Milestone make "several low budget failures, such as They Who Dare in 1954..."Whitely, 2020: "After several low budget failures, such as 'They Who Dare' in 1954, Milestone directed major Hollywood names in his last three movies..."

The Widow (La Vedova) (1954): Filmed in Italy for Ventruini/Express in 1954, and adapted by Milestone from a novel by Susan York, this "soap opera-ish love triangle" stars Patricia Roc, Massimo Serato and Anna Maria Ferrero. 
Millichap, 1981 p. 178: "...a joint British-Italian venture…" And "...soap opera-ish…" And "The triangle and its consequences are predictable, and Milestone's part in the proceedings seems simply to record the inevitable tragedy on film."

Pork Chop Hill (1959)

Produced by Sy Bartlett for the Melville Company. Pork Chop Hill represents the third work in "an informal war trilogy" along with Milestone's All Quiet on the Western Front (1930) and A Walk in the Sun (1945).McGee, 2003 TCM: "He would later turn his attention to the spectacle of war and the cohesiveness of men in battle in both A Walk in the Sun (1945) and Pork Chop Hill, which form an informal war trilogy with All Quiet on the Western Front."

Based on a recounting a Korean War battle by combat veteran S. L. A. Marshall and a screenplay by James R. Webb, Milestone was provided with a realistic literary platform from which to develop his final cinematic treatment of men at war.

The plot involves a strategically pointless assault by a company of U.S. infantrymen to secure and defend a nondescript "hill" against a much larger Chinese battalion. The context for this struggle concerns high-level truce negotiations, where the American and Korean general staffs regard this minor tactical outcome as a measure of one another's resolve. In order to take and hold the position, American troops suffer devastating losses. Ultimately, the military brass reinforces the position, but will little appreciation for the sacrifices made by the company- sacrifices of which the infantrymen are acutely aware. Film critic Kingley Canham offered this plot summary of Pork Chop Hill: "The story of a battle for a strategic point of little military value, but of great moral value, during the last days of the Korean War."

Milestone and screen star and financial investor in the project Gregory Peck, who plays company commander Lieutenant Joe Clemons, came to loggerheads over the presentation of the film's themes. Rather than emphasize the pointlessness of the military operation, Peck favored a more politicized message, equating the taking of Pork Chop Hill as equivalents to "Bunker Hill" and "Gettysburg.Canham, 1974 p. 103: "Gregory Peck...played a major role in the production of the film..." The studio's final editing of the director's cut blunted Milestone ironic message concerning the futility of war, perhaps his most anti-war statement since his 1930 All Quiet on the Western Front.Millichap, 1981 p. 179: "Milestone seems to say that the lesson of Pork Chop Hill was the futility of war...However, the changes made to the director's version [by the studio] weaken the harsh irony of this message." Biographer Joseph Millichap comments on Gregory Peck's influence on the final cut of Pork Chop Hill:

Milestone distanced himself from the final cut of the film, declaring "Pork Chop Hill became a film I am not proud of...[merely] one more war movie."

In addition to rising screen star Peck, Milestone enlisted primarily unknown actors to represent the officers and the rank and file characters, among them Woody Strode, Harry Guardino, Robert Blake (in his first adult role), George Peppard, Norman Fell, Abel Fernandez, Gavin MacLeod, Harry Dean Stanton, and Clarence Williams III.Millichap, 1981 p. 179: The company of men "represent the various types found in American war films…Harry Guardino, George Shibata, James Edwards, Woody Strode, Rip Torn, George Peppard, and Robert Blake in his first adult role."

Ocean's 11 (1960)

Milestone accepted an offer from Warner Brothers to produce and direct a picture for Dorchester Studios, Ocean's 11 a comedy-heist feature. The George Clayton Johnson story concerns of group of ex-military comrades who orchestrate an elaborate burglary of Las Vegas's biggest casinos. The movie stars the infamous Rat Pack, led by Frank Sinatra, who like the director, had been a supporter of the Committee for the First Amendment during the Red Scare. Milestone's historic success with both comedy films and combat sagas may have influenced Warner's decision to tap him for the film.

Burdened with a "preposterous" screenplay by Harry Brown and Charles Lederer, Milestone delivered a film that equivocates between a pure satire of American acquisitiveness or its celebration. The film is widely dismissed as unworthy of Milestone's talents, despite the success of Ocean's 11 at the box office. Film critic David Walsh comments of Milestone's creative difficulties in his final years:

Mutiny on the Bounty (1962)

Metro-Goldwyn-Mayer's remake of Frank Lloyd's 1935 version of the film starring Clark Gable and Charles Laughton was consistent with Hollywood's resort to blockbuster productions during the late Fifties. The studio risked over $20 million on the "ill-starred" 1962 Mutiny on the Bounty, and recovered less than half of its investment.

The 65-year-old Milestone assumed directorial duties in February 1961 after filmmaker Carol Reed became disillusioned with the project due to inadequate scripting, abominable weather (on location in Tahiti) and interpretive disputes with leading man Marlon Brando. Milestone was tasked with bringing good order and discipline to the production, and to curb the "mercurial" Brando, who had clashed with Reed. Rather than inheriting a largely completed film, Milestone discovered that only a few scenes had been shot.

The production history of the 1962 Mutiny on the Bounty emerges less as a coherent cinematic endeavor and more as a record of personal and professional recriminations registered by Milestone and Brando. In an effort to assert creative control over his character—the gentleman mutineer Fletcher Christian—Brando collaborated with screenwriters and off the set, independently of Milestone, leading the director to withdraw from some scenes and sequences and effectively relinquishing control to Brando. Film critic Joseph R. Millichap refers to the film as "the Brando-Milestone" Mutiny on the Bounty, noting that "the story of this Hollywood disaster is long and complex, but the central figure in every sense is Marlon Brando, not Lewis Milestone."

Not considered representative of the director's oeuvre, Mutiny on the Bounty is the final completed film for which Milestone was credited.

Television and unrealized film projects: 1955–1965

After completing The Widow (La Vedova) (1955) Milestone returned to the United States in search of film projects. With the Hollywood studio system in decline, Milestone resorted to television to keep working. Five years elapsed before he completed another feature film.Canham, 1974 p. 103: After making The Widow "Milestone turned to television for several years, working on a number of series including Have Gun Will Travel...but he was tempted back [to Hollywood] at the end of the decade to direct Pork Chop Hill..." In 1956–1957, Milestone partnered with actor-producer Kirk Douglas (who had debuted in Milestone's 1946 The Strange Love of Martha Ivers) to make a movie about a "Kane"-like tycoon, but King Kelly was abandoned after a year.

Milestone directed episodes for television dramas in 1957. Among these were Alfred Hitchcock Presents (two episodes), Schlitz Playhouse (two episodes) and Suspicion (one episode). In 1958, Milestone directed actor Richard Boone (who debuted in Milestone's 1952 Kangaroo) in the television western Have Gun – Will Travel (two episodes Milestone embarked upon the filming of Warner Brothers's PT 109 (1963), a biography of John F. Kennedy's experiences as a torpedo boat commander in the Pacific War. After several weeks of shooting Jack L. Warner removed Milestone from the project and replaced him with director Leslie H. Martinson, who received screen credit.
 
Milestone found television productions unappealing, but returned to that medium after completing Mutiny on the Bounty (1962), directing the series Arrest and Trial (one episode) and for The Richard Boone Show (one episode), both in 1963. Milestone's final cinematic effort was for a multinational joint venture with American International Pictures in 1965: La Guea Seno- The Dirty Game, for which he shot one episode before being replaced by Terence Young, due to his failing health.

Several of Milestone's films—Seven Sinners, The Front Page, The Racket, and Two Arabian Knights—were preserved by the Academy Film Archive in 2016 and 2017.

Death

Milestone experienced declining health in the Sixties and suffered a stroke in 1978 shortly after the death of his wife of 43-years Kendall Lee.

After further illnesses, Milestone died on September 25, 1980, at the UCLA Medical Center, just five days before his 85th birthday.

Lewis Milestone's final request before he died in 1980 was for Universal Studios to restore All Quiet on the Western Front to its original length. This request eventually was granted nearly two decades later by Universal and other film preservation companies, and this restored version is what is widely seen today on television and home video. Milestone is interred in the Westwood Village Memorial Park Cemetery in Los Angeles.

Critical appraisal

Lewis Milestone's oeuvre spans thirty-seven years (1925–1962), comprising 38 feature films. As such, he was one of the major contributors to screen art and entertainment during the Hollywood Golden Age. Like most of his contemporary American filmmakers, Milestone's work encompassed both silent and sound eras. This is evident in Milestone's complex yet efficient style, blending the visual elements of Expressionism with the Realism which evolved with naturalistic sound."

At the outset of talking pictures, the 29-year-old Milestone brought to bear his talents for an adaption of Erich Maria Remarque's compelling anti-war novel All Quiet on the Western Front, which stands as the director's magnum opus. The film is widely regarded as the high water mark of his career; Milestone's subsequent work never achieved the same artistic or critical success. Biographer Kingsley Canham observed: "The problem of making a classic film early in a career is that it sets a standard of comparison for all future work that is in some instances unfair." Milestone's films occasionally exhibit the technical inventiveness and bravura of All Quiet on the Western Front, but lack the director's commitments to a literary source or screenplay that informed his early classic.

Milestone subsequent work in Hollywood included both outstanding and mediocre efforts, characterized by their eclecticism, but often lacking any clear artistic purpose. Perhaps the most predictable feature was an application of his technical talents. Film critic Andrew Sarris remarked that "Milestone's fluid camera style has always been dissociated from any personal viewpoint. He is almost the classic example of the uncommitted director...his professionalism is as unyielding as it is meaningless." Kingsley Canham acknowledges this assessment, commenting that "time and again Milestone's career has been written off because of his lack of commitment or to involvement in his work..." Biographer Joseph R. Millichap links Milestone's "profuse, eclectic, and uneven body of work" to the imperatives of the Hollywood film industry:

Film critic and biographer Richard Koszarski considers Milestone "one of the Thirties more independent spirits...but like many of the pioneer directors...his relation to the studio system at the height of its [executive] powers was not a productive one." Koszarski offers a metaphor that Milestone had applied to his own final works:

Academy Awards

Filmography

1918 – The Toothbrush (director)
1918 – Posture (director)
1918 – Positive (director)
1919 – Fit to Win (director)
1922 – Up and at 'Em (screenwriter)
1923 – Where the North Begins (editor)
1924 – The Yankee Consul (screenwriter)
1924 – Listen Lester (screenwriter)
1925 – The Mad Whirl (screenwriter)
1925 – Dangerous Innocence (screenwriter)
1925 – The Teaser (screenwriter)
1925 – Bobbed Hair (screenwriter)
1925 – Seven Sinners (director and screenwriter)
1926 – The Caveman (director)
1926 – The New Klondike (director)
1926 – Fine Manners (director, uncredited)
1927 – The Kid Brother (director, uncredited)
1927 – Two Arabian Knights (director)
1928 – The Garden of Eden (director)
1928 – Tempest (director and screenwriter, uncredited)
1928 – The Racket (director)
1929 – New York Nights (director)
1929 – Betrayal (director)
1930 – All Quiet on the Western Front (director)
1931 – The Front Page (director)
1932 – Rain (director)
1933 – Hallelujah, I'm a Bum (director)
1934 – The Captain Hates the Sea (director)
1935 – Paris in Spring (director)
1936 – Anything Goes (director)
1936 – The General Died at Dawn (director)
1939 – Of Mice and Men (director)
1939 – The Night of Nights (director)
1940 – Lucky Partners (director and screenwriter)
1941 – My Life with Caroline (director)
1943 – Edge of Darkness (director)
1943 – The North Star (director)
1944 – Guest in the House (director, uncredited)
1944 – The Purple Heart (director)
1945 – A Walk in the Sun (director)
1946 – The Strange Love of Martha Ivers (director)
1948 – Arch of Triumph (director and screenwriter)
1948 – No Minor Vices (director)
1949 – The Red Pony (director)
1951 – Halls of Montezuma (director)
1952 – Les Misérables (director)
1952 – Kangaroo (director)
1953 – Melba (director)
1954 – They Who Dare (director)
1955 – La Vedova X (director and screenwriter)
1957 – Alfred Hitchcock Presents (TV series) (director)
1957 – Schlitz Playhouse (TV series) (director)
1957 – Suspicion (TV series) (director)
1958 – Have Gun – Will Travel (TV series) (director)
1959 – Pork Chop Hill (director)
1960 – Ocean's 11 (director)
1962 – Mutiny on the Bounty (director)
1963 – The Richard Boone Show (TV series) (director)
1963 – Arrest and Trial (TV series) (director)

 Footnotes 

 
References
Arnold, Jeremy. 2009. Hallelujah, I'm a Bum. Turner Classic Movies. https://www.tcm.com/tcmdb/title/77232/hallelujah-im-a-bum/#articles-reviews Retrieved 30 January 2021.
Arnold, Jeremy. 2003. The Strange Love of Martha Ivers. Turner Classic Movies. https://www.tcm.com/tcmdb/title/91604/the-strange-love-of-martha-ivers#articles-reviews?articleId=60067 Retrieved 5 February 2021.
Arnold, Jeremy. 2008. The Red Pony. Turner Classic Movies. https://www.tcm.com/tcmdb/title/87865/the-red-pony#articles-reviews?articleId=203353 Retrieved 11 February 2021.
Barson, Michael. 2020. Lewis Milestone: American Film Director https://www.britannica.com/biography/Lewis-Milestone Retrieved 10 January 2021. 
Baxter, John. 1970. Hollywood in the Thirties. International Film Guide Series. Paperback Library, New York. LOC Card Number 68-24003.
Baxter, John. 1971. The Cinema of Josef von Sternberg. London: A. Zwemmer / New York: A. S. Barnes & Co.
Cady, Brian. 2004. The Racket (1928). Turner Classic Movies. https://dev.tcm.com/tcmdb/title/499953/the-racket#articles-reviews?articleId=85281 Retrieved 17 January 2021.
Canham, Kingsley. 1974. The Hollywood Professional, Volume 2: Henry King, Lewis Milestone, Sam Wood. The Tantivy Press, London. 
Criterion Collection, 2014. Of Mice and Men (Lewis Milestone, 1939). Criterion.com https://makeminecriterion.wordpress.com/2014/01/23/of-mice-and-men-lewis-milestone-1939/ Retrieved 31 January 2021. 
Cojoc, Andrei. 2013. The Message of American pro-Soviet Movies during WW II - The North Star, Song of Russian, Mission to Moscow. http://journal.centruldedic.ro/wp-content/uploads/2020/01/Andrei-Cojoc_2013-1.pdf
 Crowther, Bosley. 1951. THE SCREEN IN REVIEW; 'Halls of Montezuma,' Realistic Depiction of Goriness of War, Presented at Roxy Theatre. New York Times. January 6, 1951. https://www.nytimes.com/1951/01/06/archives/the-screen-in-review-halls-of-montezuma-realistic-depiction-of.html Retrieved 19, 2021.
Gow, Gordon. 1971. Hollywood in the Fifties. The International Film Guide Series, A.S. Barnes & Co. New York. and The Tantivy Press.
Higham, Charles and Greenberg, Joel. 1968. Hollywood in the Forties. A.S Barnes & Co. Inc. Paperback Library, New York. 1970. 
Higham, Charles. 1974. The Art of the American Film. Anchor Press, Doubleday. 
 Higham, Charles. 1973. The Art of the American Film: 1900-1971. Doubleday & Company, Inc. New York. . Library of Congress Catalog Card Number 70-186026.
Hoberman, J. 2014. Soviet Valor, Revised for the '50s. Movie Home Video. https://www.nytimes.com/2014/07/27/movies/homevideo/lewis-milestone8217s-8216armored-attack8217-and-8216arch-of-triumph8217.html Retrieved 2 February 2021. 
Erickson, Glenn. 2010. Errol Flynn Adventures. Turner Classic Movies. https://www.tcm.com/tcmdb/title/2891/edge-of-darkness/#articles-reviews?articleId=344157 Retrieved 31 January 2021.
Erickson, Glenn. 2014. Arch of Triumph on Blu-Ray. Turner Classic Movies. https://www.tcm.com/tcmdb/title/67562/arch-of-triumph#articles-rev Retrieved 10 February 2021.
Koszarski, Richard. 1976. Hollywood Directors: 1914-1940. Oxford University Press. Library of Congress Catalog Number: 76-9262.
Koszarski, Richard. 1983. The Man You Loved to Hate: Erich von Stroheim and Hollywood. Oxford University Press. 
McGee, Scott. 2003. Pork Chop Hill. Turner Classic Movies. https://www.tcm.com/tcmdb/title/17710/pork-chop-hill#articles-reviews?articleId=31521 Retrieved 22 February 2021.
Miller, Frank. 2007. Rain (1932). Turner Classic Movies. http://dev.tcm.com/tcmdb/title/87613/rain/#articles-reviews?articleId=161060 Retrieved 23 January 2021.
Miller, Frank. 2010. Behind The Camera - Mutiny On The Bounty ('62). Turner Classic Movies. https://www.tcm.com/tcmdb/title/12737/mutiny-on-the-bounty#articles-reviews?articleId=288489 Retrieved 23 February
Millichap, Joseph R. 1981. Lewis Milestone. University of Tulsa, Twayne Publishers. C. K. Hall & Company. 
Murphy, Brenda. 1999. Congressional Theatre: Dramatizing McCarthyism on Stage, Film and Television. Cambridge University Press. http://catdir.loc.gov/catdir/samples/cam032/99040314.pdfISBN 0521640881 
Passafiume, Andrea. 2009. The North Star. Turner Classic Movies. https://www.tcm.com/tcmdb/title/85227/the-north-star#articles-reviews?articleId=276075 Retrieved 31 January 2021.
Rhodes, Gary D. 2020. The Milestones of Milestone. Los Angeles Review of Books. https://lareviewofbooks.org/article/the-milestones-of-milestone/Retrieved 10 January 2021.
Safford, Jeff. 2008. Ocean's Eleven. Turner Classic Movies. https://www.tcm.com/tcmdb/title/18360/oceans-eleven/#articles-reviews?articleId=88915 Retrieved 21 February 2021.
Steffen, James. 2010. The Captain Hates the Sea. Turner Classic Movies. https://www.tcm.com/tcmdb/title/70233/the-captain-hates-the-sea#articles-reviews?articleId=333881 Retrieved 31 January 2021.
Steffen, James. 2007. A Walk in the Sun. Turner Classic Movies. https://www.tcm.com/tcmdb/title/94993/a-walk-in-the-sun#articles-reviews?articleId=161092 Retrieved 9 February 2021.
Strago, Michael. 2017. The Front Page: Stop the Presses! Criterion Collection. https://www.criterion.com/current/posts/4382-the-front-page-stop-the-presses Retrieved 22 January 2021.
Tatara, Paul. 2009. Of Mice and Men (1939). Turner Classic Moviles https://www.tcm.com/tcmdb/title/85392/of-mice-and-men#articles-reviews?articleId=240794 Retrieved 25 January 2021.
Tatara, Paul. 2011. My Life With Caroline. Turner Classic Movies.https://www.tcm.com/tcmdb/title/1584/my-life-with-caroline#articles-reviews?articleId=409106 Retrieved 31 January 2011.
Thomson, David. 2015. All Quiet on the Western Front. https://silentfilm.org/all-quiet-on-the-western-front/ Retrieved 11 January 2021.
 Walsh, David. 2001. A dull thud; or, Filmmaking in bad faith: Ocean's Eleven, directed by Steven Soderbergh, screenplay by Ted Griffin. https://www.wsws.org/en/articles/2001/12/ocea-d11.html Retrieved 1 February 2021.
Whiteley, Chris. 2020. Lewis Milestone (1995-1978). Hollywood's Golden Age. http://www.hollywoodsgoldenage.com/moguls/lewis-milestone.html Retrieved 18 January 2021. 
Wood, Bret. 2003. The Front Page (1975). Turner Classic Movies. https://www.tcm.com/tcmdb/title/5902/the-front-page#articles-reviews?articleId=62600 Retrieved 22 January 2021.Bibliography'Genovés, Fernando R. (2013), Mervyn LeRoy y Lewis Milestone. Cine de variedades vs. de trinchera, Amazon-Kindle. 
Harlow Robinson (2019), Lewis Milestone :Life and Films'',The University Press of Kentucky

External links

 
 
 Lewis Milestone at Virtual History
 Lewis Milestone papers, Margaret Herrick Library, Academy of Motion Picture Arts and Sciences

1895 births
1980 deaths
Film people from Chișinău
People from Kishinyovsky Uyezd
Moldovan Jews
Bessarabian Jews
Emigrants from the Russian Empire to the United States
American film directors
American film producers
American male screenwriters
Best Directing Academy Award winners
Burials at Westwood Village Memorial Park Cemetery
20th-century American male writers
20th-century American screenwriters